Voorne-Putten is an island between the North Sea, the Brielse Meer and the rivers Oude Maas, Spui and Haringvliet in the province of South Holland. Voorne-Putten consists of the two former islands Voorne (the larger, western part) and Putten (the smaller, eastern part). It used to be separated by the river Bernisse which silted up and made the two islands one. It has 160,000 inhabitants (2008). Recently the riverbed has been dredged, and the two islands have been reformed.

The North Sea coast of Voorne is a valuable nature reserve (sand dunes), even though the northern part of the area has lost much of its estuarine character with the building of the Maasvlakte, an extension of the Port of Rotterdam, in the 1960s. The rest of the island is a mostly agricultural region. The largest town is Spijkenisse.
Voorne-Putten consists of the following municipalities:
 Voorne:
 Voorne aan Zee
 Nissewaard - Bernisse (Heenvliet, Abbenbroek, Oudenhoorn, and Zuidland)
 Putten:
 Nissewaard - Bernisse (Geervliet and Simonshaven) and Spijkenisse

Voorne-Putten is separated
from the island of Rozenburg on the north by the Brielse Meer (dam and bridge)
from IJsselmonde island on the north-east by the Oude Maas (bridge and metro tunnel)
from Hoeksche Waard island on the south-east by the Spui (ferry)
from Goeree-Overflakkee island on the south by Haringvliet (dam)

References 

 
Islands of the Rhine–Meuse–Scheldt delta
Islands of South Holland
Regions of South Holland
Regions of the Netherlands